Marine salvage is the process of recovering a ship and its cargo after a shipwreck or other maritime casualty. Salvage may encompass towing, re-floating a vessel, or effecting repairs to a ship. Today, protecting the coastal environment from spillage of oil or other contaminants is a high priority. Before the invention of radio, salvage services would be given to a stricken vessel by any ship that happened to be passing by. Nowadays, most salvage is carried out by specialist salvage firms with dedicated crew and equipment.

The legal significance of salvage is that a successful salvor is entitled to a reward, which is a proportion of the total value of the ship and its cargo. The amount of the award is determined subsequently at a "hearing on the merits" by a maritime court in accordance with Articles 13 and 14 of the International Salvage Convention of 1989. The common law concept of salvage was established by the English Admiralty Court, and is defined as "a voluntary successful service provided in order to save maritime property in danger at sea, entitling the salvor to a reward"; and this definition has been further refined by the 1989 Convention.

Originally, a "successful" salvage was one where at least some of the ship or cargo was saved, otherwise the principle of "No Cure, No Pay" meant that the salvor would get nothing. In the 1970s, a number of marine casualties of single-skin-hull tankers led to serious oil spills. Such casualties were unattractive to salvors, so the Lloyd's Open Form (LOF) made provision that a salvor who acts to try to prevent environmental damage will be paid, even if unsuccessful. This Lloyd's initiative proved so advantageous that it was incorporated into the 1989 Convention.

All vessels have an international duty to give reasonable assistance to other ships in distress in order to save life, but there is no obligation to try to salve the vessel. Any offer of salvage assistance may be refused; but if it is accepted a contract automatically arises to give the successful salvor the right to a reward under the 1989 Convention.  Typically, the ship and the salvor will sign up to an LOF agreement so that the terms of salvage are clear. Since 2000, it has become standard to append a SCOPIC ("Special Compensation – P&I Clubs") clause to the LOF, so as to circumvent the limitations of the "Special Compensation" provisions of the 1989 Convention (pursuant to the case of The Nagasaki Spirit).
They put a placard on the wreckage, reading "redeemed".

History

In 219 BC, the Chinese Emperor Qin Shihuang (r. 221–210 BC) assembled an expedition consisting of a thousand people for an unsuccessful salvage attempt of the Nine Tripod Cauldrons.

In Early Modern Europe, diving bells were often used for salvage work. In 1658, Albrecht von Treileben was contracted by King Gustavus Adolphus of Sweden to salvage the warship , which sank in Stockholm harbor on its maiden voyage in 1628. Between 1663 and 1665 von Treileben's divers were successful in raising most of the cannon, working from a diving bell. In 1687, Sir William Phipps used an inverted container to recover £200,000-worth of treasure from a Spanish ship sunk off the coast of San Domingo.

The era of modern salvage operations was inaugurated with the development of the first surface supplied diving helmets by the inventors, Charles and John Deane and Augustus Siebe, in the 1830s. , a 100-gun first-rate ship of the line of the Royal Navy, sank undergoing routine maintenance work in 1782, and the Deane brothers were commissioned to perform salvage work on the wreck. Using their new air-pumped diving helmets, they managed to recover about two dozen cannons.

Following on from this success, Colonel of the Royal Engineers Charles Pasley commenced the first large scale salvage operation in 1839. His plan was to break up the wreck of Royal George with gunpowder charges and then salvage as much as possible using divers.

Pasley's diving salvage operation set many diving milestones, including the first recorded use of the buddy system in diving, when he ordered that his divers operate in pairs. In addition, the first emergency swimming ascent was made by a diver after his air line became tangled and he had to cut it free. A less fortunate milestone was the first medical account of a helmet squeeze suffered by a Private Williams: the early diving helmets used had no non-return valves on the breathing air supply hose; this meant that if a hose became severed near or above the surface, the high-pressure air around the diver's head rapidly escaped from the helmet leaving a large pressure difference between the water and the suit and helmet interior that tended to force the diver into rigid interior of the helmet. At the British Association for the Advancement of Science meeting in 1842, Sir John Richardson described the diving apparatus and treatment of diver Roderick Cameron following an injury that occurred on 14 October 1841 during the salvage operations.

Pasley recovered 12 more guns in 1839, 11 more in 1840, and 6 in 1841. In 1842 he recovered only one iron 12-pounder because he ordered the divers to concentrate on removing the hull timbers rather than search for guns. Other items recovered, in 1840, included the surgeon's brass instruments, silk garments of satin weave 'of which the silk was perfect', and pieces of leather; but no woollen clothing. By 1843 the whole of the keel and the bottom timbers had been raised and the site was declared clear.

Types of salvage

There are four types of salvage:

Contract salvage
In contract salvage the owner of the property and salvor enter into a salvage contract prior to the commencement of salvage operations and the amount that the salvor is paid is determined by the contract.  This can be a fixed amount, based on a "time and materials" basis, or any other terms that both parties agree to.  The contract may also state that payment is only due if the salvage operation is successful (a.k.a. "No Cure, No Pay"), or that payment is due even if the operation is not successful. By far the commonest single form of salvage contract internationally is Lloyd's Standard Form of Salvage Agreement (2011, superseded in 2020), an English law arbitration agreement administered by the Council of Lloyd's, London.

Pure salvage
In the United States, in pure salvage (also called "merit salvage"), there is no contract between the owner of the goods and the salvor. The relationship is one which is implied by law. The salvor of property under pure salvage must bring his claim for salvage in a court which has jurisdiction, and this will award salvage based upon the "merit" of the service and the value of the salvaged property.

Pure salvage claims are divided into "high-order" and "low-order" salvage. In high-order salvage, the salvor exposes himself and his crew to the risk of injury and loss or damage to his equipment in order to salvage the property that is in peril. Examples of high-order salvage are boarding a sinking ship in heavy weather, boarding a ship which is on fire, raising a ship, plane, or other sunken property, or towing a ship which is in the surf away from the shore. Low-order salvage occurs where the salvor is exposed to little or no personal risk. Examples of low-order salvage include towing another vessel in calm seas, supplying a vessel with fuel, or pulling a vessel off a sand bar. Salvors performing high order salvage receive substantially greater salvage award than those performing low order salvage.

In order for a claim to be awarded three requirements must be met: The property must be in peril, the services must be rendered voluntarily (no duty to act), and finally the salvage must be successful in whole or in part.

There are several factors that would be considered by a court in establishing the amount of the salvor's award. Some of these include the difficulty of the operation, the risk involved to the salvor, the value of the property saved, the degree of danger to which the property was exposed, and the potential environmental impacts. It would be a rare case in which the salvage award would be greater than 50 percent of the value of the property salvaged. More commonly, salvage awards amount to 10 percent to 25 percent of the value of the property.

Private boat owners, to protect themselves from salvage laws in the event of a rescue, would be wise to clarify with their rescuer if the operation is to be considered salvage, or simply assistance towing.  If this is not done, the boat owner may be shocked to discover that the rescuer may be eligible for a substantial salvage award, and a lien may be placed on the vessel if it is not paid.

Naval salvage

Several navies have Rescue Salvage vessels which are to support their fleet and to come to the aid of vessels in distress. In addition they may have Deep Salvage Units. A DSU (salvage) is a unit attached to the US Navy.

Plunder
When vessels are lost in an unknown area, or are not protected, a potential salvor might discover and plunder the wreck without knowledge of the wreck's owner. Salvaging a foreign navy's vessel is against international law.

Intelligence salvage
The CIA, who conducted the salvage under the guise of "mining the seafloor for manganese nodules" with a commercial vessel, spent over $800 million (1974 dollars) on the clandestine operation now known as Project Azorian.

Ship salvage and the law 

Salvage law has as a basis that a salvor should be rewarded for risking his or her life and property to rescue the property of another from peril. Salvage law is in some ways similar to the wartime law of prize, the capture, condemnation and sale of a vessel and its cargo as a spoil of war, insofar as both compensate the salvor/captors for risking life and property. The two areas of law may dovetail.  For instance, a vessel taken as a prize, then recaptured by friendly forces on its way to the prize adjudication, is not deemed a prize of the rescuers (title merely reverts to the original owner).  But the rescuing vessel is entitled to a claim for salvage. Likewise a vessel found badly damaged, abandoned and adrift after enemy fire disabled her does not become a prize of a rescuing friendly vessel, but the rescuers may claim salvage.

A vessel is considered in peril if it is in danger or could become in danger. Examples of a vessel in peril are when it is aground or in danger of going aground. Prior to a salvage attempt the salvor receives permission from the owner or the master to assist the vessel. If the vessel is abandoned no permission is needed.

The amount of the award depends on, in part, the value of the salved vessel, the degree of risk involved and the degree of peril the vessel was in. Legal disputes do arise from the claiming of salvage rights. To reduce the amount of a claim after an accident, boat owners or skippers often remain on board and in command of the vessel; they do everything possible to minimise further loss and seek to minimize the degree of risk the vessel is in. If another vessel offers a tow and the master or owner negotiates an hourly rate before accepting then salvage does not apply.

Some maritime rescue organisations, such as Britain's Royal National Lifeboat Institution, do not insist the crews of their lifeboats renounce their right to claim compensation for salvage., but should they choose to make a claim, they must pay for the use of the lifeboat and make good any damage suffered by her. Claims for salvage by lifeboat crews are rare.
Jetsam are goods that were thrown off a ship, which was in danger, to save the ship. Flotsam are goods that floated off the ship while it was in danger or when it sank. Ligan or lagan are goods left in the sea on the wreck or tied to a buoy so that they can be recovered later by the owners. Derelict is abandoned vessels or cargo.

In the United Kingdom under the Merchant Shipping Act 1995, jetsam, flotsam, lagan and all other cargo and wreckage remain the property of their original owners. Anyone, including recreational divers and beachcombers, removing those goods must inform the Receiver of Wreck to avoid the accusation of theft. As the leisure activity of wreck diving is common, there are laws to protect historic wrecks of archaeological importance and the Protection of Military Remains Act 1986 protects ships and aircraft that are the last resting place of the remains of members of the armed forces.

The 1910 Brussels Convention for the Unification of Certain Rules with Respect to Assistance and Salvage at Sea reflects the traditional legal principles of marine salvage.  The 1989 International Convention on Salvage incorporated the essential provisions of the 1910 Convention, and added some new provisions besides. The 1989 Salvage Convention entered force on 14 July 1996 with nearly twenty parties in agreement. For states which are parties to both conventions, the 1989 Convention takes precedence over the 1910 one where their provisions are mutually incompatible.

Notable salvage operations 

 The largest marine salvage operation on record was the raising of the German High Seas Fleet which was scuttled at Scapa Flow in 1919.  Between 1922 and 1939, 45 of the 52 warships sunk, including six battleships, five battlecruisers, five cruisers and 32 destroyers were raised from the bottom of the flow at depths of up to 45 metres, primarily by Cox & Danks Ltd & Metal Industries Ltd, and broken up for scrap.
They were key participants in the Battle of Surigao Strait in October 1944.
 The Swedish 17th-century warship  was raised in April 1961. She had lain on the bottom of Stockholm harbor since her capsizing on her maiden voyage in 1628.
 The raising and subsequent conservation of Mary Rose, the flagship of the navy of King Henry VIII, which sank in 1545 in the Solent, North of the Isle of Wight.  As with Vasa, the salvage of Mary Rose in 1982 was an operation of immense complexity and was a major achievement in marine archaeology.  The remains of the ship, together with recovered weapons, sailing equipment and crew's personal effects are now on display at Portsmouth Historic Dockyard and the nearby Mary Rose Museum.
Some of the techniques developed by Roen for the salvage of George M. Humphrey established methods which became new standards for future salvages, where before many wrecks were considered too heavy and large to salvage.
In 1968 Shipwrecks Inc., headed by E. Lee Spence, was granted South Carolina State Salvage License No. 1 to salvage the wreck of the American Civil War blockade runner  under that state's new underwater antiquities act, which had been drafted and passed at the instigation of Spence, who had discovered the wreck in 1965. Spence's work on the wreck was some of the very first underwater archaeology done in the United States. Spence and his crew raised over 1,000,000 individual artifacts, conservatively valued at over $12,000,000. The artifacts fell into three basic groups: medicines, munitions and merchandise. They ranged from tiny brass sewing pins and glass buttons to heavy iron cannons and included such things as cannonballs; bullets; bottles; pottery; carved bone toothbrushes; pencils; match cases; and Wedgwood china.
 In 1974 the U.S. CIA attempted to recover the sunken Soviet Golf-class submarine  in the secret and expensive intelligence operation Project Azorian. The attempt was only partially successful.
 Nuestra Señora de Atocha was discovered in 1985 with recovered gold and other artifacts worth an estimated US$400 million.
 The SS Central America, which sank in 1857 carrying  of gold, was discovered in 1988. Salvage efforts remain incomplete.
 Vrouw Maria was discovered in 1999, and after a protracted legal battle, plans for salvage are still in the discussion and planning stage. It is known to contain priceless works of art.
 On 12 August 2000, the Russian   sank in the Barents Sea following an internal explosion, leading to the death of 118 sailors and officers. A portion of the destroyed submarine was raised to the surface in late 2001 to recover the bodies and eliminate the hazard from Kursks two nuclear reactors.
  was severely damaged in October 2000 by terrorists while it was harbored in the Yemeni port of Aden. It was rescued, salvaged, and repaired to serve again.
 In July 2002,  suffered serious damage due to a navigational error, striking Wolf Rock near Lord Howe Island. She was towed, stern first to Newcastle, New South Wales in August 2002 for minor repairs and was consequently returned to the United Kingdom aboard the heavy lifting vessel .
 In July 2006, the Japanese car carrier Cougar Ace, packed with 4,700 Mazda cars and Isuzu trucks bound for the North American market, was traveling from Japan to Vancouver, British Columbia, when it stranded in the Pacific Ocean. The ship's condition quickly began to deteriorate as it took on water. The salvage team involved had to work solidly for 24 days straight to try and save the vessel and its extremely lucrative cargo.
 In May 2007, Odyssey Marine Exploration undertook the Black Swan Project and recovered an estimated US$500 million in silver and gold coins from a shipwreck in the Atlantic Ocean. However, the wreck and its contents were claimed by the Spanish government. A legal dispute through United States Federal Courts was resolved in February 2012, when it was reported that U.S. Magistrate Judge Mark Pizzo had ordered Odyssey to return the coins to Spain by 24 February 2012 for dispersal to museums, not to heirs. The Supreme Court declined to stay this order and Odyssey has agreed to abide by the decision.
 In 2021, Phoenix International Holdings, Inc. (Phoenix), under the direction of the U.S. Navy's Supervisor of Salvage and Diving (SUPSALV), located and recovered the fuselage of a downed MH-60 Seahawk helicopter in the Philippine Sea from a record breaking depth of  beneath the surface. This is  deeper than the previous salvage record, also set by Phoenix and SUPSALV during the recovery of a C-2 Greyhound aircraft in 2019. M. Heinrich | Semantic Scholar

See also

References

Works cited

Further reading

External links 

Salvage Law Links
Largest ever salvage award Cherry Valley and tug J.A. ORGERON in 1994
Proceedings of the Workshop on State-level Responses to Abandoned and Derelict Vessels National Oceanic and Atmospheric Administration
Salvage Code Red A new documentary for National Geographic Channel looking at the world of marine salvage
WRECKSITE Worldwide free database of + 65.000 wrecks with history, maritime charts and GPS positions
The International Convention on Salvage 1989 (complete text PDF)

 
Admiralty law
Chinese inventions
Shipwrecks